Tichodroma is the only known genus in the family Tichodromidae. Initially, Linnaeus placed Tichodroma in the family Certhiidae, along with the treecreepers., while other athourities have placed it the nuthatch family Sittidae, as its own subfamily. A 2016 phylogenetic study of members in the superfamily Certhioidea suggests it is a sister of the Sittidae.

The wallcreeper (Tichodroma muraria) is the only extant species, but the extinct Tichodroma capeki is known from the Late Miocene of Polgardi, Hungary.

References

Bird genera
Bird genera with one living species